Austrogomphus is a genus of dragonflies in the family Gomphidae, 
endemic to Australia.
Species of Austrogomphus are tiny to medium-sized dragonflies, black in colour with yellowish markings. They are commonly known as hunters.

Species

The genus Austrogomphus includes the following species in four subgenera:

Subgenus Austroepigomphus
Austrogomphus (Austroepigomphus) praeruptus 

Subgenus Austrogomphus 
Austrogomphus angelorum  - Murray River hunter
Austrogomphus arbustorum  - toothed hunter
Austrogomphus australis  - inland hunter
Austrogomphus collaris  - western inland hunter
Austrogomphus cornutus  - unicorn hunter
Austrogomphus doddi  - northern river hunter
Austrogomphus guerini  - yellow-striped hunter
Austrogomphus mjobergi  - pimple-headed hunter
Austrogomphus mouldsorum  - Kimberley hunter
Austrogomphus ochraceus  - jade hunter
Austrogomphus pusillus  - tiny hunter

Subgenus Pleiogomphus
Austrogomphus (Pleiogomphus) amphiclitus  - pale hunter
Austrogomphus (Pleiogomphus) bifurcatus  - dark hunter
Austrogomphus (Pleiogomphus) divaricatus  - fork hunter
Austrogomphus (Pleiogomphus) prasinus  - lemon-tipped hunter

Subgenus Xerogomphus
Austrogomphus (Xerogomphus) gordoni  - western red hunter
Austrogomphus (Xerogomphus) turneri  - flame-tipped hunter

Etymology
The genus name Austrogomphus is derived from two words: the latin word auster meaning south wind, hence south; and the greek word gomphus (γόμφος) meaning peg or nail. It is suggested that the shape of the male tail is generally like that of a bolt used in ship building. Gomphus is also a genus of dragonfly, with some similarities to Austrogomphus, both belonging to the much larger family group, Gomphidae. In 1854 Edmond de Sélys Longchamps named the sub-genus Austrogomphus probably as a southern or Australian component of the gomphid group.

See also
 List of Odonata species of Australia

References

Gomphidae
Anisoptera genera
Odonata of Australia
Endemic fauna of Australia
Taxa named by Edmond de Sélys Longchamps
Taxonomy articles created by Polbot